Think Peace is a registered non-profit charitable trust under government of India providing development aid in tribal regions of Andhra Pradesh and Orissa from more than eight years. It is headquartered in Hyderabad, Telangana.

History
Think Peace initiated with an aim to lower the development deficit and strengthen the tribal communities through strategic interventions and planned initiatives. Think peace started with  its founder Kiran Chukkapalli distributing some fundamental need to the people in tribal region. In the due course of time Think Peace evolved into an NGO for all their work in more than 230 hamlets since 12 years across Andhra Pradesh. They also took a step forward in developing the lives of children around 200 villages in Araku Valley, Andhra Pradesh.

References

External links

Charities based in India